Alexander Köll (born 2 December 1990) is a Swedish former World Cup alpine ski racer who competed in two editions (2017 and 2019) of the FIS Alpine World Ski Championships.

Career
Alexander Köll has competed for Sweden since 2009. Since 2015, he has competed in every season of the World Cup.

On 10 December 2020, he was badly hurt when crashing during practice in Val d'Isere.

On 25 July 2022, he announced his retirement from alpine skiing following the 2021–2022 season.

World Championships results

References

External links
 

1990 births
Living people
Swedish male alpine skiers
People from Landskrona Municipality
Sportspeople from Skåne County